Solidago californica is a species of goldenrod known by the common name California goldenrod.

It is native to western North America from Oregon through California to Baja California. It grows in many types of habitats, including oak woodlands, valley grassland, chaparral, and sometimes disturbed areas.

Description

The inflorescence is a narrow, often one-sided series or cluster of many flower heads.

References

External links
Jepson Manual Treatment: Solidago californica
United States Department of Agriculture Plants Profile
Solidago californica — Calphotos Photo gallery, University of California

californica
Flora of Baja California
Flora of California
Flora of Oregon
Flora of the Sierra Nevada (United States)
Plants described in 1840
Flora without expected TNC conservation status